Peyman Salmani (born April 18, 1994) is an Iranian Footballer goalkeeper who currently plays for Zob Ahan.

Club career

Zob Ahan
Salmani was part of Zob Ahan Academy from 2010. He was promoted to the first team by Rasoul Korbekandi in summer 2012. He made his debut for Zob Ahan on May 1, 2015 against Naft Masjed Soleyman as a substitute for Mohammad Rashid Mazaheri.

Club Career Statistics

Honours

Club
Zob Ahan
Hazfi Cup (2): 2014–15, 2015–16
Iranian Super Cup (1): 2016

References

External links 
 Peyman Salmani at IranLeague.ir
 Peyman Salmani at PersianLeague.com

1994 births
Living people
Zob Ahan Esfahan F.C. players
Iranian footballers
Association football goalkeepers